Jatun Urqu (Quechua jatun big, urqu mountain, "big mountain", also spelled Jatun Orkho) is a  mountain in the Bolivian Andes. It is located in the Cochabamba Department, Esteban Arce Province, Sacabamba Municipality, northeast of the village of Matarani.

References 

Mountains of Cochabamba Department